An inborn error of steroid metabolism is an inborn error of metabolism due to defects in steroid metabolism.

Types
A variety of conditions of abnormal steroidogenesis exist due to genetic mutations in the steroidogenic enzymes involved in the process, of which include:

Generalized
 20,22-Desmolase (P450scc) deficiency: blocks production of all steroid hormones from cholesterol
 3β-Hydroxysteroid dehydrogenase 2 deficiency: impairs progestogen and androgen metabolism; prevents the synthesis of estrogens, glucocorticoids, and mineralocorticoids; causes androgen deficiency in males and androgen excess in females
 Combined 17α-hydroxylase/17,20-lyase deficiency: impairs progestogen metabolism; prevents androgen, estrogen, and glucocorticoid synthesis; causes mineralocorticoid excess
 Cytochrome P450 oxidoreductase deficiency: prevents production of numerous but not all sex steroids, as well as other metabolic reactions

Androgen- and estrogen-specific
 Isolated 17,20-lyase deficiency: prevents androgen and estrogen synthesis.
 Cytochrome b5 deficiency: subtype of isolated 17,20-lyase deficiency; additionally results in elevated methemoglobin and/or methemoglobinemia
 17β-Hydroxysteroid dehydrogenase 3 deficiency: impairs androgen and estrogen metabolism; results in androgen deficiency in males and androgen excess and estrogen deficiency in females
 5α-Reductase 2 deficiency: prevents the conversion of testosterone to dihydrotestosterone; causes androgen deficiency in males
 Aromatase deficiency: prevents estrogen synthesis; causes androgen excess in females
 Aromatase excess: causes excessive conversion of androgens to estrogens; results in estrogen excess in both sexes and androgen deficiency in males.

Glucocorticoid- and mineralocorticoid-specific
 21-Hydroxylase deficiency: prevents glucocorticoid and mineralocorticoid synthesis; causes androgen excess in females
 11β-Hydroxylase 1 deficiency: impairs glucocorticoid and mineralocorticoid metabolism; causes glucocorticoid deficiency and mineralocorticoid excess as well as androgen excess in females
 11β-Hydroxylase 2 deficiency: impairs corticosteroid metabolism; results in excessive mineralocorticoid activity
 18-Hydroxylase deficiency: prevents mineralocorticoid synthesis; results in mineralocorticoid deficiency
 18-Hydroxylase overactivity: impairs mineralocorticoid metabolism; results in mineralocorticoid excess

Miscellaneous
In addition, several conditions of abnormal steroidogenesis due to genetic mutations in receptors, as opposed to enzymes, also exist, including:
 Gonadotropin-releasing hormone (GnRH) insensitivity: prevents synthesis of sex steroids by the gonads in both sexes
 Follicle-stimulating (FSH) hormone insensitivity: prevents synthesis of sex steroids by the gonads in females; merely causes problems with fertility in males
 Luteinizing hormone (LH) insensitivity: prevents synthesis of sex steroids by the gonads in males; merely causes problems with fertility in females
 Luteinizing hormone (LH) oversensitivity: causes androgen excess in males, resulting in precocious puberty; females are asymptomatic

No activating mutations of the GnRH receptor in humans have been described in the medical literature, and only one of the FSH receptor has been described, which presented as asymptomatic.

See also

References

Further reading

External links 

Adrenal gland disorders
Cholesterol and steroid metabolism disorders
Endocrine gonad disorders
Genetic diseases and disorders
Rare diseases
Intersex variations